Pseudodaphnella aureotincta is a species of sea snail, a marine gastropod mollusk in the family Raphitomidae.

Description
This is a minor form of Pseudodaphnella tincta (Reeve, 1846). The longitudinal ribs are swollen, with white ribs alternating with golden yellow ribs. The elongate-fusiform shell shows a broader, golden-yellow band in the depression near the siphonal canal.

Distribution
This marine species occurs off New Caledonia.

References

 Bouge, L.J. & Dautzenberg, P.L. 1914. Les Pleurotomides de la Nouvelle-Caledonie et de ses dependances. Journal de Conchyliologie 61: 123–214

External links
 
 Fedosov A. E. & Puillandre N. (2012) Phylogeny and taxonomy of the Kermia–Pseudodaphnella (Mollusca: Gastropoda: Raphitomidae) genus complex: a remarkable radiation via diversification of larval development. Systematics and Biodiversity 10(4): 447-477

aureotincta
Gastropods described in 1897